Equality Township is an inactive township in Miller County, in the U.S. state of Missouri.

Equality Township was established in 1837, and named for the virtue of equality.

References

Townships in Missouri
Townships in Miller County, Missouri